USS Benham (Destroyer No. 49/DD-49) was an  built for the United States Navy prior to the American entry into World War I. The ship was the first U.S. Navy vessel named in honor of Rear Admiral Andrew E. K. Benham.

Benham was laid down by William Cramp & Sons of Philadelphia in March 1912 and launched in March 1913. She was armed with four  guns and had eight 18 inch (450 mm) torpedo tubes.

After her January 1914 commissioning, she assisted her sister ship  when that ship suffered an explosion in one of her fire rooms in April. After a period in reserve, Benham served on Neutrality Patrol duty. She picked up officers and crew from a Dutch cargo ship before the U-boat sank it. After the United States entered World War I in April 1917, Benham was sent overseas to patrol the Irish Sea out of :Queenstown, Ireland. Benham made several unsuccessful attacks on U-boats. During her overseas service, Benham was rammed by HMS Zinnia and nearly sunk.

Upon returning to the United States after the war in January 1919, Benham was placed in reduced commission. After alternating periods of activity and time in reserve, Benham was decommissioned at Philadelphia in July 1922. She was struck from the Naval Vessel Register in March 1935 and ordered scrapped in April.

Design and construction
Construction of the vessel—like her three sister ships—was awarded to William Cramp & Sons of Philadelphia which laid down her keel on 14 March 1912. On 22 March 1913, Benham was launched by sponsor Edith Wallace Benham, daughter of the ship's namesake, Andrew Ellicot Kennedy Benham. The ship was the first U.S. Navy vessel named in honor of the American admiral.

Benham had two steam turbines that drove her two screw propellers, and an additional pair triple-expansion steam engines, each connected to one of the propeller shafts, for cruising purposes.

In early 1917, Benhams single  guns were replaced with twin  guns on an experimental basis. However, before Benham departed for overseas service during World War I, her original single gun mounts had been restored. Benham was also equipped with four twin mount  torpedo tubes.

Pre-World War I
USS Benham was commissioned into the U.S. Navy on 20 January 1914 under the command of Lieutenant Commander Charles J. Train. In February and March, Benham conducted a shakedown cruise to the West Indies and, in April, began operations out of Hampton Roads, Virginia. An explosion ripped through the forward fire room on Aylwin, injuring three men. Benham loaded the three wounded sailors and sped to the naval hospital at Norfolk, Virginia, while Parker took on the remainder of Aylwins crew. One of the injured men died on Benham before landfall was made in Virginia; another died a short time later. Aylwin remained afloat but, unmanned, was towed into Norfolk by Parker and U.S. Navy tug . The crews of all three destroyers raised $250 to help defray funeral expenses for the widow of one of the men. In July, the Benham went into reserve at the New York Navy Yard. She came back into active service on 21 December 1914.

In August 1916, the U.S. Navy conducted what The New York Times called the "greatest war game undertaken by the American Navy." In the scenario, a 'Blue' force defended the East Coast of the United States against a 'Red' force attempting an amphibious landing. Benham, scouting for the Blue force, was the first to spot the inbound Red transports and their escorts, but an attack on the transports by the Red force was repulsed, leading to a Blue victory.

Prior to the entrance of the United States into World War I, she served on Neutrality Patrol duty, trying to protect American and neutral-flagged merchant ships from interference by British or German warships and U-boats. In the course of performing those duties, Benham was at Newport, Rhode Island, in early October 1916. At 05:30 on 8 October, wireless reports came in of a German submarine stopping ships near the Lightship Nantucket, off the eastern end of Long Island. After an SOS from the British steamer SS West Point was received at about 12:30, Rear Admiral Albert Gleaves ordered Benham and other destroyers at Newport to attend to survivors. The American destroyers arrived on the scene about 17:00 when the U-boat,  under the command of Kapitänleutnant Hans Rose, was in the process of stopping the Holland-America Line cargo ship SS Blommersjdijk. Shortly after, U-53 stopped the British passenger ship SS Stephano. As Rose had done with three other ships U-53 had sunk earlier in the day, he gave passengers and crew aboard Blommersdijk and Stephano adequate time to abandon the ships before sinking the pair. In total, 226 survivors from U-53s five victims were rescued by the destroyer flotilla. Benham picked up the captain of and crewmen from Blommersdijk for transport to Newport.

World War I
After the United States entered World War I on 6 April 1917, Benham was one of the first group of destroyers chosen for anti-submarine duty in European waters. She departed Tompkinsville, New York on 17 May and arrived in Queenstown, Ireland on 24 May. Four days later, the destroyer began the first of many tours of duty at sea hunting U-boats and shepherding convoys to their destinations.

Her first encounter with U-boats came on 13 July when she was apparently attacked by two submarines. They launched a total of three torpedoes at Benham, but she and her convoy evaded them. The destroyer then drove them away with a depth charge attack. Immediately, she charged to the attack with guns and depth charges. Later, her crew sighted air bubbles and oil on the surface. The British Admiralty commended her for probable damage to a German U-boat. The destroyer continued her patrols out of Queenstown until June 1918 when she moved to Brest, France, her base of operations through the end of the war.

In September 1917, during her European wartime service, Benham was rammed by the British  HMS Zinnia. The event is not mentioned in the Dictionary of American Naval Fighting Ships; the extent of the damage to both ships is unknown.
A photograph from the U.S. Navy's Naval History & Heritage Command website shows a nearly sunken Benham moored between two ships.

Postwar
On 21 December 1918, Benham put to sea from Brest for the last time and began the voyage back to the United States. Rejoining the Atlantic Fleet at the beginning of 1919, the warship participated in the annual fleet maneuvers held in Cuban waters and then made a cruise to the Azores in May. Upon her return to the United States that summer, she was placed in ordinary at Norfolk on 28 June. Active again in 1921, she patrolled the eastern seaboard until assigned duty as plane guard and tender to the Atlantic Fleet Air Squadrons. That duty terminated in May 1922, and she stood into Philadelphia on 12 May to prepare for inactivation.

Benham was decommissioned at Philadelphia on 7 July 1922. The ship was struck from the Naval Vessel Register on 8 March 1935, and, on 23 April, was ordered scrapped at the Philadelphia Navy Yard.

Notes

References

Bibliography

External links
 

 

Aylwin-class destroyers
Ships built by William Cramp & Sons
1913 ships
World War I destroyers of the United States